The Aba Formation found in Sichuan Province of China.

It dates to Early Triassic Period, and contains several types of slate.

References

Lower Triassic Series
Geologic formations of China
Geology of Sichuan
Triassic System of Asia